Monterroso may refer to:
Places
Monterroso, a Galician municipality
Rio Monterroso, an intermittent stream in the Province of Málaga, Spain
People
Augusto Monterroso, a Guatemalan writer
Benjamín Monterroso, a Guatemalan football coach
José Benito Monterroso, a Uruguayan cleric
Ana Monterroso de Lavalleja